Éditions Larousse is a French publishing house specialising in reference works such as dictionaries. It was founded by Pierre Larousse and its best-known work is the Petit Larousse. 

It was acquired from private owners by Compagnie Européenne de Publication in 1984, then Havas in 1997. It was acquired by Vivendi Universal in 1998.  Vivendi made losses in 2002 and sold Larousse to the Lagardère Group, thus satisfying public opinion by keeping Larousse in French hands, despite objections by smaller publishers about Lagardère's virtual monopoly on French publishing. It has been a subsidiary of Hachette Livre since 2004.

It also offers the Larousse Gastronomique and a free, open-content encyclopedia.

The logo is designed by Jean Picart Le Doux (1955-1970), Jean-Michel Folon (1972), Philippe Starck (2006), Christian Lacroix, Moebius, Karl Lagerfeld (1999) and Jean-Charles de Castelbajac (2014).

See also

 Grand dictionnaire universel du XIXe siècle, 1866–1876 encyclopedia with 1877 and 1890 supplements
 Nouveau Larousse illustré (New Larousse Illustrated), 1897–1904 encyclopedia
 Grand Larousse encyclopédique, 1960-1964 encyclopedia
 Grand Dictionnaire Encyclopédique Larousse, 1982–1985 dictionary and encyclopedia
 Petit Larousse (1905)

Notes

Book publishing companies of France
French brands